Pascual Donat Llopis (born 4 April 1968) is a Spanish football manager for SB Ontinyent, and former footballer who played as a right-back. He had a 20-year association with the club Villarreal.

Club career
A youth product of his local club Ontinyent, Donat began his senior career with Alzira in 1986. In the summer of 1987, he transferred to Sevilla, where he was originally assigned to Sevilla Atlético - their reserve team. The following season, he debuted for the senior Sevilla FC team in La Liga and was used sparingly by them.

In the summer of 1992, he moved to Villarreal where he spent the longest part of his career. He captained the club when they earned promotion into La Liga for the first time in their history in 1998. A charismatic player, he had a fan club around the time they got promoted. After 8 seasons with the club, he moved in the summer of 2001 to Burriana. He followed that up with stints with the semi-pro clubs Ontinyent, Alcoyano and Novelda before retiring in 2006.

After his playing career, Donat returned to Villarreal where he coached their youth sides and B-team, helping the latter earn promotion to the Segunda División B in 2007. He spent over 20 years with the club, before leaving in 2018. He since returned to his hometown to manage SB Ontinyent.

References

External links

1968 births
Living people
People from Vall d'Albaida
Spanish footballers
Spanish football managers
Association football fullbacks
La Liga players
Segunda División players
Segunda División B players
Tercera División players
UD Alzira footballers
Sevilla Atlético players
Sevilla FC players
Villarreal CF players
Ontinyent CF players
CD Alcoyano footballers
Novelda CF players
Villarreal CF B managers